Millettia aurea is a species of plant in the family Fabaceae. It is found only in Madagascar.

References

aurea
Endemic flora of Madagascar
Endangered plants
Taxonomy articles created by Polbot